Pascault Row is a national historic district in Baltimore, Maryland, United States. It was built by Louis Pascault, Marquis de Poleon and consists of a range of eight -story dwellings.  It is Baltimore's last remaining example of early-19th-century townhouses, and illustrates the transition between the Federal and the early Greek Revival periods.  They are attributed to William F. Small, at that time employed in the architectural office of Benjamin Henry Latrobe.

It was added to the National Register of Historic Places in 1973.

References

External links
Pascault Row at Explore Baltimore Heritage
, including photo from 2004, at Maryland Historical Trust

Downtown Baltimore
Houses on the National Register of Historic Places in Baltimore
Historic districts in Baltimore
Federal architecture in Maryland
Greek Revival houses in Maryland
Historic American Buildings Survey in Baltimore
Historic districts on the National Register of Historic Places in Maryland
Baltimore City Landmarks